Bhiwani City railway station is located in Bhiwani district in the Indian state of Haryana. Its code is BNWC. It serves Bhiwani city. This station is right now under development as indian railway is right now increasing the count of platform and many other facilities.

Major trains 
Some of the important trains that run from Bhiwani City are:

 Bhiwani Delhi Passenger (unreserved)
 Bhiwani Rohtak Passenger (unreserved)
 Abhilash Komal Express
 Abhilash Mansi Passenger (unreserved)
Abhilash Chanchal Express (reserved)
 Abhilash Medha express
(Resserved)
 Kalindi express

References 

Railway stations in Bhiwani district
Bikaner railway division
Railway stations in India opened in 1884